= Voice parts =

Voice parts may refer to:

- Voice type - soprano, baritone, etc.
- Voice acting jobs
